Mt. Airy is a historic house in Cordova, Tennessee. It was built in 1835 for Asbury Crenshaw, his son Timothy, and their relatives. The Crenshaws were settlers who owned slaves. By 1850, it was acquired by Roscoe Feild, a Crenshaw relative who graduated from Princeton University and took part in the California Gold Rush. During the American Civil War, Feild served in the Confederate States Army. The house was subsequently inherited by his descendants, the Lattings.

The house was designed in the Classical Revival architectural style. It has been listed on the National Register of Historic Places since February 14, 2002.

References

Houses on the National Register of Historic Places in Tennessee
National Register of Historic Places in Shelby County, Tennessee
Neoclassical architecture in Tennessee
Houses completed in 1835